The 2020 Vietnamese National U-19 Football Championship is split into five groups with the 5 group winners will advance to the second phase of the campaign along with the three best runners-up.

Teams
A total of 26 teams will participate in the 2020 season with only players born between 1 January 2001 and 1 January 2004 are eligible for participation.

First phase
The 26 teams were drawn into 4 groups of 5 teams (Groups B–E) with Group A having 6 teams, Each team in their respective groups will play each other twice. Eight teams will then progress to the second phase of the competition.

Group A

Group B

Group C

Group D

Group E

Best second-placed

Second phase

Group A

Group B

Final phase

References

2020 in Vietnamese football
Youth football in Vietnam
2020 in youth association football